Platanoussa (before 1927: Ραψίστα - Rapsista) is a village and a community in the municipal unit of Katsanochoria, Ioannina regional unit, Epirus, Greece. The community consists of the villages Platanoussa, Dafni and Zoodochos Pigi. Platanoussa is situated on the eastern slope of the Xerovouni mountain, above the right bank of the river Arachthos, at about 500 m above sea level. It is 8 km northeast of Anogeio, 29 km north of Arta and 31 km southeast of Ioannina.

Population

See also

List of settlements in the Ioannina regional unit

External links
Platanoussa at the GTP Travel Pages

References

Populated places in Ioannina (regional unit)